Molins or Molíns may refer to:

 Places
 Molins de Rei, a municipality near Barcelona, Spain
 Molins-sur-Aube, a commune in Champagne-Ardenne, France
 Palace of the Marquis of Molíns, a building in Madrid, Spain
 Pont de Molins, a municipality in Catalonia, Spain

 People
 Pierre de Molins, 13th-century trouvère (French songster)
 Roger de Moulins, 12th-century Grand Master of the Knights Hospitaller
 P. des Molins, 14th-century French composer
 Adam Molins (d. 1450), English bishop
 Emilio Molíns, Spanish army officer, Governor-General of the Philippines
 Jason Molins (born 1974), Irish cricketer
 Greg Molins (born 1976), Irish cricketer
 Guillermo Molins (born 1988), Swedish-Uruguayan footballer
 Lara Molins (born 1980), Irish cricketer
 Mariano Roca de Togores, 1st Marquis of Molíns (1812–1889), Spanish nobleman
 Louis Sala-Molins (born 1935), French academic

 Other uses
 Molins gun, a variation of the Ordnance QF 6-pounder anti-tank gun

See also 
 Molin (disambiguation)
 Molino (disambiguation)
 Molinos (disambiguation)